Bradford is a ghost town in Wabaunsee County, Kansas, United States.  It was located between Eskridge and Harveyville.

History
A post office was opened in Bradford in 1890, and remained in operation until it was discontinued in 1941.

References

Further reading

External links
 Wabaunsee County maps: Current, Historic, KDOT

Unincorporated communities in Wabaunsee County, Kansas
Unincorporated communities in Kansas